The Herbert Mountains are a conspicuous group of rock summits on the east side of Gordon Glacier in the Shackleton Range of Antarctica. They were first mapped in 1957 by the Commonwealth Trans-Antarctic Expedition (and named for Sir Edwin S. Herbert, Chairman of the Finance Committee and a Member of the Committee of Management of the expedition, 1955–58.

Features
Geographical features include:

 Bernhardi Heights
 Bonney Bowl
 Charlesworth Cliffs
 Charpentier Pyramid
 Geikie Nunatak
 Högbom Outcrops
 Hollingworth Cliffs
 Jamieson Ridge
 Kendall Basin
 Maclaren Monolith
 Mount Absalom
 Ramsay Wedge
 Schimper Glacier
 Shaler Cliffs
 Sumgin Buttress
 Venetz Peak

References

Mountain ranges of Coats Land